Claasen is a surname. Notable people with the surname include:

 Daylon Claasen (born 1990), South African international footballer
 Hermann Claasen (1899–1987), German photographer

See also
 Claasen's law, a law of technology usefulness
 Classen (surname)
 Claassen
 Klaasen
 Klaassen